The Progressive Democratic Party was a political party in Trinidad and Tobago. It contested the 1946 general elections, but received just 515 votes and failed to win a seat. It did not run in the 1950 elections, but returned for the 1956 elections. However, it again failed to win a seat, and did not contest any further elections.

References

Defunct political parties in Trinidad and Tobago